Liodopria is a genus of beetles belonging to the family Leiodidae.

The species of this genus are found in Europe.

Species:
 Liodopria cambogensis Angelini & De Marzo, 1984 
 Liodopria hlavaci Angelini & Cooter, 2002

References

Leiodidae